Summer 08 is the fifth studio album by English electronic music band Metronomy, released on 1 July 2016 by Because Music.

Recording and release
Summer 08 is Metronomy's first album recorded solely by member Joseph Mount since their debut effort, Pip Paine (Pay the £5000 You Owe). Its title and release date was announced on BBC Radio 1 in an interview with Annie Mac on 11 May 2016, simultaneously with a release of the album's first single, "Old Skool". Collin Robinson of Stereogum called the song a "disco-leaning, 808-heavy, DJ-scratching throwback of a jam." The track "Mick Slow" samples most of the track "Weather the Windmill" from Mick Karn's first solo album, Titles. Metronomy included Karn's track in their edition of the Late Night Tales series in 2012.

Critical reception
Summer 08 received mostly positive reviews from music critics. According to critic review aggregator Metacritic, the album has received a score of 74/100, based on 23 reviews, indicating "generally favorable". Laura Snapes of Pitchfork writes that "Metronomy's latest record strips away any pretense that they are a band, focusing on its sole creator, Joe Mount. The album solidifies his own idiosyncratic brand of standoffish funk."

Track listing

Charts

References

2016 albums
Because Music albums
Metronomy albums